State Route 289 (SR 289) is a  state highway in southern Humboldt County, Nevada, United States. The route serves the city of Winnemucca and the route's western end runs concurrent with Interstate 80 Business (I‑80 Bus.).

Route description

SR 289 begins at the intersection of Melarkey Street and Winnemucca Boulevard in downtown (commercial district of) Winnemucca. (Melarkey Street is the dividing point between West Winnemucca Boulevard and East Winnemucca Boulevard. Melarkey Street continues northwest as U.S. Route 95 [US 95], but southeast as just a city street. West Winnemucca Boulevard (I‑80 Bus./US 95) continues southwest to an interchange with I‑80.) From its western terminus, SR 289 heads northeast along East Winnemucca Boulevard (I‑80 Bus./US 95) as a four-lane road to cross South Bridge Street and Baud Street before passing briefly passing by the northwest edge of a residential area and the southeast end of the short Barrett Street. After crossing Reinhart Street, commercial district resumes on both sides of SR 289 before it passes the southeast end of the short Hurst Street.

The route then turns slightly to a more northerly course as it gains a median strip between its four lanes, just before reaching its next intersection with East 2nd Street. From this T intersection, East Winnemucca Boulevard heads southwest as SR 794/I‑80 Bus., while SR 289 continues northeast along East 2nd Street. Next the route quickly reaches a diamond interchange with Interstate 80 (Exit 178), followed by a T intersection with the south end of See Drive (a dirt road which very briefly heads southeast from SR 289 before turning northwest and then looping back to SR 289). After passing See Drive, SR 289 loses its median strip and narrows to a two-lane road; remaining as such for the rest of its length.

Traveling through rural area, the route passes northwest of a mobile home park before leaving the city limits of Winnemucca and immediately reaching a T intersection with the north end of See Drive (which heads southeast from the route and is paved for a short section on its north end). Finally SR 289 reaches its eastern terminus at an intersection with Reinhart Drive (SR 795). From the eastern terminus of SR 289, East 2nd Street continues northeast through Weso to end near the south bank of the Humboldt River. SR 795 heads northwest to cross the Humboldt River and connect with US 95.

History
The highway was formerly part of Nevada State Route 1 and later U.S. Route 40. SR 289 became a state highway on July 1, 1976, during the renumbering of Nevada's state highway system.

Major intersections

See also

 List of state routes in Nevada
 List of highways numbered 289

Notes

References

External links

289
U.S. Route 40
Transportation in Humboldt County, Nevada
Winnemucca, Nevada